Solo–Kertosono Toll Road (Soker Toll Road) is part of Trans-Java toll road in the island of Java, Indonesia. The toll road connects to Semarang–Solo Toll Road in the west, and in the east it connects to Kertosono–Mojokerto Toll Road. This toll road has a total length of 177.12 km comprise two segments, segment Solo–Ngawi and segment Ngawi–Kertosono. The road passes through eight regions: Boyolali Regency, Karanganyar Regency, Solo City, Sragen Regency in Central Java Province, and Ngawi, Madiun, Nganjuk and Jombang Regency in East Java Province. When commencing operation, Solo–Kertosono Toll Road, known as Soker Toll Road. The toll road is the longest toll road in Indonesia.

History
Administratively, Soker Toll Road with a total length of 177.12 km comprise two segments, segment Solo–Mantingan–Ngawi and segment Ngawi–Kertosono. The length of Solo–Mantingan–Ngawi toll road is 90.1 kilometer, while the length of Ngawi–Kertosono is 87.02 kilometer. Hence, in the beginning, Soker Toll Road was designed as two separate toll roads. However, during its tender process, no investors showed interest in bidding these two toll roads except one bidder, which is PT Thiess Contractors Indonesia. On June 28, 2011, Toll Road Concession Agreement (PPJT) amendment has been signed in Jakarta. With this concession agreement, segment Solo-Mantingan-Ngawi will be under PT Solo–Ngawi Jaya, while segment Ngawi-Kertosono will be under PT Ngawi–Kertosono Jaya. Both of this companies are subsidiaries of PT Thiess Contractors Indonesia. Since both of toll road concessions have been awarded to the same company, these two toll roads usually are referred as Solo–Kertosono Toll Road, or Soker Toll Road. Construction started in 2012 and the company aimed to finish the project in 2014, but the company was only able to acquire 80 percent of the needed land. The construction has been left idle due to financing and land clearing difficulties. Then State-run toll road operator Jasa Marga and state-owned construction company Waskita Karya taken over from Thiess Contractors in 2015, with about Rp 439 billion (US$34.15 million). Jasa Marga now owns 60 percent of the shares in the project, while Waskita Karya owns the remaining 40 percent.

Segments
Soker Toll Road with a total length of 177.12 km comprise two segments,

Solo–Ngawi
This 90 km length segment namely Phase I, the SS Ngawi-Klitik (Ngawi) segment as long as 4 km has been operating since March 30, 2018, Phase II Kartasura-Sragen was inaugurated on July 15, 2018, and Phase III Sragen-Ngawi was inaugurated on November 28. The Sragen- Ngawi Toll Road is equipped with eight toll gates, namely GT Colomadu, GT Adi Airport, GT Ngemplak, GT Gondangrejo, GT Karanganyar, GT Sragen, East Sragen GT, and GT Ngawi (Ngawi City).

Ngawi–Kertosono
This segment is 87.12 km in length with 2 sections. The 52-kilometer (km)-long section Ngawi-Wilangan was inaugurated in March 2018, which has four toll gates at Ngawi, Madiun, Mejayan, and Wilangan. The remaining part was inaugurated on 20 December 2018.

Exits

Solo-Ngawi

Ngawi-Kertosono

References

Toll roads in Indonesia
Musical roads
Surakarta
Transport in Central Java
Transport in East Java